Albert "Al" Neri  is a fictional character appearing in Mario Puzo's 1969 novel The Godfather and Francis Ford Coppola's trilogy of films based on it. In all three motion pictures, he is portrayed by actor Richard Bright. He functions as Michael Corleone's personal enforcer, bodyguard and assassin.

In the novel 
In the novel The Godfather, Neri begins his career as a New York City police officer, where he earns a reputation for a fierce temper, quick reflexes, and physical strength. He frequently patrols with a large flashlight, which he uses to assault Italian youths who run with gangs or to shatter the windshields of diplomats who disregard traffic or parking laws.

After his wife leaves him, Neri kills a drug-dealer and pimp by cracking his skull with the flashlight and is convicted of manslaughter.

Tom Hagen and Peter Clemenza see Neri as a potential replacement for Luca Brasi, Vito Corleone's feared enforcer, and arrange his release from prison. Normally, policemen are barred from becoming made men, but they were impressed enough with Neri to recommend that Michael grant an exception to the rule. Michael, appealing to Neri's sense of loyalty and Sicilian-American roots, recruits him into Clemenza's regime. Clemenza is initially impressed by the ferocity that Neri displays in their first meeting. Neri later 'makes his bones' and becomes Michael's chief lieutenant by personally murdering Moe Greene and Emilio Barzini on Michael's behalf. Neri carries out the latter murder while disguised in his old police uniform.

After Salvatore 'Sal' Tessio is executed for betraying Michael, Neri is promoted to caporegime of Tessio's former crew, and plays a key role in the wave of murders that re-establishes the Corleones as the most powerful crime family in the nation. When Michael and his family move to Nevada, Neri becomes head of security for all hotels controlled by the Corleones.

In the film series 
In the film version of The Godfather, Neri's backstory is not mentioned. He does not say a word in the first film and following Michael's return from exile in Sicily, Neri becomes his bodyguard, accompanying him everywhere. In the famous 'baptism sequence', Neri, disguised in a police uniform, guns down Barzini and his bodyguards on the steps of a courthouse, much as he does in the novel. However, the murder of Greene, which occurs simultaneously, is handled by another, anonymous gunman.

In The Godfather Part II, Neri is portrayed as Michael's unofficial second-in-command in his operations in Nevada, and is one of Michael's capos along with Rocco Lampone and Frank Pentangeli. In a deleted scene, Neri is shown "convincing" Meyer Klingman, a hotel owner, to give his interest in the hotel to the Corleone family. When Klingman protests, Neri slaps him in the face and pursues him through the casino's showroom, while casino security guards (now under Corleone control) do nothing.

During a Senate investigation of Michael's criminal syndicate, Neri is identified as a capo for the Corleone family on an organization chart. He also carries out the execution of Michael's brother Fredo Corleone, under Michael's orders: while out fishing together on Lake Tahoe, Al Neri shoots Fredo in the back of the head.

By the time of The Godfather Part III, with Michael's decision to 'go legitimate' by selling his casino interests and transferring control of his rackets to former subordinate Joey Zasa, Neri continues to serve as his bodyguard, as well as becoming the new underboss (replacing Fredo Corleone). When Zasa betrays Michael and attempts to have him murdered at a meeting of the Commission in Atlantic City, Neri saves Michael's life and later helps Michael's nephew, Vincent Mancini, to plan Zasa's murder. When Michael retires and transfers control of the family to Vincent, Neri is the second to pledge his loyalty, after Calò, the former bodyguard of Don Tommasino. In the closing scenes of the film, Vincent calls upon Neri's skills one last time, sending him to infiltrate Vatican City, where he guns down corrupt Archbishop Gilday and tosses his body down a staircase.

In other media 
In Mark Winegardner's novel The Godfather's Revenge, Neri and his nephew take part in an attempt to obtain information from antagonist Nick Geraci's father. He is seriously wounded in a shootout at the end of the novel.

In The Godfather: The Game, Neri is voiced by Terry McGovern.

References

External links 
 Al Neri on IMDb

The Godfather characters
Characters in American novels of the 20th century
Characters in American novels of the 21st century
Fictional bodyguards
Fictional contract killers
Fictional Italian American people
Literary characters introduced in 1969
Fictional gangsters
Fictional New York City Police Department officers
Male characters in literature
Male characters in film
Cultural depictions of the Mafia
Film characters introduced in 1972